In the United States and Canada, Mexican Coca-Cola, or Mexican Coke (English: Glass Coca-Cola, or Coca-Cola in a glass bottle) or, informally, "Mexicoke", refers to Coca-Cola produced in and imported from Mexico. Mexican Coca-Cola is sweetened with white sugar instead of the high-fructose corn syrup used in the U.S. since the early 1980s.  Some tasters have said that Mexican Coca-Cola tastes better, while other blind tasting tests reported no perceptible differences in flavor. 

Coca-Cola made in the United States uses a different recipe, containing high-fructose corn syrup, in contrast to the sugar used by the Mexican formula for export.
As of 2023, the domestic version of Coca-Cola sold in Mexico contains an artificial sweetener sucralose, with a can containing one-third less sugar than the export product.

History 
The Coca-Cola Company opened its first bottling franchise in Mexico around 1921 with Grupo Tampico, and then Grupo ARMA. Monterrey-based FEMSA is currently the largest Coca-Cola bottler in Mexico and most of Latin America.

The Coca-Cola Company originally imported the Mexican-produced version into the U.S. primarily to sell it to Mexican immigrants who grew up with that formula. Mexican Coke was first sold at grocers who served Latino clientele, but as its popularity grew among non-Latinos, by 2009 larger chains like Costco, Sam's Club and Kroger began to stock it. It is now readily available at most grocery stores throughout the United States.

In 2013, a Mexican Coca-Cola bottler announced it would stop using cane sugar in favor of glucose-fructose syrup. It later clarified this change would not affect those bottles specifically exported to the United States as "Coca-Cola Nostalgia" products.

A scientific analysis of Mexican Coke found no sucrose (standard sugar), but instead found total fructose and glucose levels similar to other soft drinks sweetened with high-fructose corn syrup, though in different ratios.

Taste 

Results from taste tests have been mixed. In a tasting conducted by a local Westchester, New York magazine, some tasters noted that the Mexican Coke had "a more complex flavor with an ineffable spicy and herbal note," and that it contained something "that darkly hinted at root beer or old-fashioned sarsaparilla candies." However, participants in a different double-blind test preferred American Coca-Cola. Participants in taste tests conducted by Coca-Cola and others reported no perceptible differences in flavor between American Coke and the Mexican formulation.

Bottle
Mexican Coca-Cola is sold in a thick  or  glass bottle, which some have contrasted as being "more elegant, with a pleasingly nostalgic shape," compared to the more common plastic American Coca-Cola bottles. Formerly, Coca-Cola was widely available in refundable and non-refundable glass bottles of various sizes in the U.S., but nearly all bottlers began replacing most glass bottles with plastic during the late 1980s. Most exporters of Mexican Coke affix a paper sticker on each bottle containing the nutrition facts label, ingredients, and bottler and/or exporter's contact information, to meet US food labeling requirements.

Adding to the nostalgia factor, the Mexican Coca-Cola bottle does not have a twist-off cap as American glass and plastic bottles do.

See also

Pepsi-Cola Made with Real Sugar, a line of Pepsi products flavored with cane sugar

References

Further reading
 

Coca-Cola
Coca-Cola brands
Mexican drinks